Cima may refer to:

Acronyms
The Center for International Media Assistance, a media development organization in Washington, DC
Centre International de la Mécanique d'Art (International centre for Art Mechanics), a museum in Switzerland
Channel Industries Mutual Aid, a Houston emergency response organization
Chartered Institute of Management Accountants (formed 1919)
Costruzione Italiana Macchine Attrezzi (Italian Machine Tool Company), the gear and transmission manufacturing subsidiary of 
Cyprus Institute of Marketing (established 1978)
Chenille International Manufacturers Association

People
Cima da Conegliano (about 1459 – 1517), Italian renaissance painter
Cima (wrestler) (born 1977), ring name of Japanese professional wrestler Nobuhiko Oshima

Locations
Estádio Ítalo del Cima (inaugurated 1960), football stadium in Campo Grande neighborhood, Rio de Janeiro, Brazil
Fajã de Cima, parish in the district of Ponta Delgada in the Azores
Ilhéu de Cima, islet in the Cape Verde Islands
Cima, California, United States

Other
CIMA: The Enemy, console role-playing game
Cima Garahau, character in the fictional Universal Century timeline of the Japanese Mobile Suit Gundam science fiction franchise
Nissan Cima (launched 1988), automobile manufactured by Nissan
CIMA (AM), a defunct radio station (1040 AM) located in Vancouver, British Columbia, Canada
Cima (gastropod), a genus of marine snails in the family Cimidae

See also
 Chima (disambiguation)
 Cima (surname)
 Seema (disambiguation)
 Sema (disambiguation)
 Sima (disambiguation)